Citizens for Conservation (commonly called CFC) is a nonprofit organization, centered in Barrington, Illinois, established in 1971.  CFC's motto is Saving Living Space for Living Things through protection, restoration and stewardship of land, conservation of natural resources and education.  It is a member of Chicago Wilderness and the Land Trust Alliance.

CFC specializes in habitat restoration, both on properties it owns and nearby forest preserves of Lake County Forest Preserve District and Forest Preserve District of Cook County.  CFC relies almost entirely on volunteers, meeting at least once a week year-round.  In addition, student interns are hired during the summer.

CFC received the 2011 Conservation and Native Landscaping award from the U.S. EPA and Chicago Wilderness for its restoration work on the Flint Creek Savanna, their largest property and location of their headquarters.

CFC properties 
As of early 2020, CFC owned 12 properties for a total of 476 acres.  Much of this is agricultural land that was donated or purchased, and restored back to natural habitat, primarily oak savanna, tallgrass prairie, and wetlands.  Removal of invasive species and re-seeding of native species from local seed sources is the main focus of habitat restoration.  It has the largest holding of fee simple lands (direct ownership) of any non-profit in Lake County, Illinois.

Education 
CFC offers periodic programs for children as part of the No Child Left Inside project, and works with the local school district to introduce 3rd and 4th graders to the prairie.   It also provides occasional community education programs for adults.

References 

Nature conservation organizations based in the United States
Ecological restoration